Lake Cuyamaca, also called Cuyamaca Reservoir, is a  reservoir and a recreation area in the eastern Cuyamaca Mountains, located in eastern San Diego County, California.

Geography
California State Route 79 wraps around three shores, and provides access to/from Julian to the north and I−8 to the south.

History
The dam at Lake Cuyamaca is the second-oldest in California still in use, and was completed in 1888. It was built to supply drinking water to the city of San Diego. It was originally piped down to San Diego in wooden flumes. It continues to be part of a municipal water supply system for the Helix Water District.

In the mid-1960s, the Lake Cuyamaca Recreation and Park District was formed. Through various projects over time, it has created a more permanent water supply infrastructure and new recreation features at the reservoir.

Recreation
Lake Cuyamaca is a recreation area operated by the Lake Cuyamaca Recreation and Park District and the Helix Water District. It offers boating, fishing, picnicking, birdwatching, hiking, wedding and party venues, cabin rentals and camping. A store, restaurant, pub, and tackle shop are onsite, as well as boat rentals.

The reservoir is stocked with over 38,000 lbs. of trout annually, and is the only San Diego lake that is able to stock trout all year long. Other species of fish include Florida bass, smallmouth bass, channel catfish, crappie, bluegill and sturgeon.

Conical Middle Peak is above the area on the west, and North Peak on the north. Hiking trails reach the summit of Cuyamaca Peak, located to the southwest of Lake Cuyamaca and in Cuyamaca Rancho State Park.

See also
 Lake Cuyamaca (Wikimedia Commons)
 Cuyamaca Rancho State Park
 List of dams and reservoirs in California

References

External links
Lakecuyamaca.org: official Lake Cuyamaca Recreation and Park District website
 California State Parks.gov: Cuyamaca Rancho State Park website

Cuyamaca
Cuyamaca Mountains
East County (San Diego County)
Parks in San Diego County, California
Campgrounds in California
Cuyamaca
Cuyamaca
1888 establishments in California